Bangs is a surname. Notable people with the surname include:

 Alan Bangs, music journalist and radio presenter
 David Bangs, field naturalist, conservationist and author
 Francis S. Bangs, American lawyer
John Kendrick Bangs, 19th-century writer
 Lester Bangs (1948–1982), American music journalist
 Lance Bangs (born 1972), American filmmaker
Nan Bangs (1913–2012) known more commonly as Nan Bangs McKinnell, American ceramicist. 
Outram Bangs (1863–1932), American zoologist.

See also 

 Bang (surname)